Jung Nam (Hangul: 정남; born January 30, 1968) is a Korean voice actor who joined the Munhwa Broadcasting Corporation's Voice Acting Division in 1996. She also has acting experience and was in the Korean version of 24 as Nina Myers.

Roles

Broadcast TV
24 (replacing Sarah Clarke, Korea TV edition, MBC)
CSI: Miami (replacing Khandi Alexander, Korea TV edition, MBC)
Ojamajo Doremi (1st series in Majoruca, Korea TV edition, MBC)
Apple Tree (narration, MBC)
Risingo (Korea TV edition, MBC)
Children's to New Life (narration, MBC)
Mother's Song (MBC)
Honey, I Shrunk the Kids: The TV Show (Korea TV edition, MBC)

Movie dubbing
Sabrina (Korea TV edition, MBC)
Unagi (Korea TV edition, MBC)
Independence Day (Korea TV edition, MBC)
Blade II (replacing Leonor Varela, Korea TV edition, MBC)

See also
Munhwa Broadcasting Corporation
MBC Voice Acting Division

External links
MBC Voice Acting division Jeong Nam blog (in Korean)
Ad Sound Jeong Nam Blog (in Korean)

South Korean voice actresses
1968 births
Living people